Cerataphis orchidearum, the fringed orchid aphid, is a species of aphid in the family Aphididae. It is found in Europe. Aphids of this species have been found on a Daemonorops lewisiana plant being tended to by yellow crazy ants.

References

Hormaphidinae
Articles created by Qbugbot
Insects described in 1879